French Roast is a 2008  French computer-animated short created by Fabrice Joubert. The short received the Best Animation Award at ANIMA Córdoba and was nominated for Academy Award for Best Animated Short Film in 2010 but lost to Logorama.

French Roast is the first short film by Fabrice O. Joubert, an animator, who worked from 1997 to 2006 at DreamWorks Animation and later worked as the animation director of A Monster in Paris (2011).

Plot
In a fancy Parisian Café c. 1960, an uptight businessman man sits at a table and orders a coffee. He cannot seem to pay so he begins to stall while in the background a disheveled beggar can be seen walking into the cafe asking for spare change.

Release
French Roast was first released in France on 30 October 2008 at the Festival Voix d'Etoiles. It was later released in the Czech Republic on 3 May 2009 at the AniFest Film Festival, in Canada on 19 February 2010 in Waterloo, Ontario and in the USA on 19 February 2010, limited release.

Accolades
Fabrice Joubert was presented with the Elña for Best Animation at the 2009 Córdoba International Animation Festival. Fabrice Joubert has been nominated for Academy Award for Best Animated Short Film in 2010 ending up losing to Logorama.

References

External links
 
 
 

2008 films
2000s French animated films
French short films
2000s animated short films
2008 animated films
2000s French films